The 2011 IPSC Handgun World Shoot XVI held at Rhodes, Greece was the 16th IPSC Handgun World Shoot. There were 30 stages which all had a Greek theme.

Champions

Open
Individual
The Open division had the second largest match participation with 373 competitors (30.9 %), and was won by Eric Grauffel from France winning his 5th consecutive Handgun World Shoot. Simon Racaza of USA came in second place 3.29 % behind, and KC Eusebio of USA another 0.71 % behind.

Teams

Modified 
Individual
The Modified division had 59 competitors (4.9 %). Zdenek Henes of the Czech Republic took Gold in the Modified division in what would be the last World Championship featuring the division before it was deleted. Jerome Jovanne Morales of the Philippines came in second place 0.75 % behind, and Rob Leatham of USA came in third place another 2.41 % behind.

Teams

Standard 
Individual
The Standard division had the third largest match participation with 336 competitors (27.8 %), and was won by Blake Miguez of USA. Juan Carlos Jaime of Argentina came in second place 1.09 % behind, and Ted Puente of USA came in third place another 3.2 % behind.

Teams

Production 
Individual
The Production division had the largest match participation with 397 competitors (32.8 %), and was won by Bob Vogel of the US. Ben Stoeger of the US came in second place 2.34 % behind, and Matthew Mink of the US another 0.85 % behind.

Teams

Revolver 
Individual
The Revolver division had 44 competitors (3.6 %), and was won by Ricardo López Tugendhat of Ecuador claiming his second consecutive Handgun World Shoot victory in the Revolver division. Jerry Miculek of USA came in second place 5.16 % behind, and Matthew Griffin of USA came in third place another 6.42 % behind.

Teams

See also 
IPSC Rifle World Shoots
IPSC Shotgun World Shoot
IPSC Action Air World Shoot

References

Official Final Results (Full): 2011 HG World Shoot XVI
IPSC :: Match Results (Summary) - 2011 Handgun World Shoot, Greece

2011
IPSC Handgun
Shooting competitions in Greece
2011 in Greek sport
International sports competitions hosted by Greece